Motijheel may refer to:
 Motijheel, an area in Dhaka.
 Motijheel Thana, in Dhaka.
 Motijheel Avenue, an area in North Kolkata, India.

Schools with the name
 Motijheel Model High School and College
 Motijheel Government Boys' High School

Lakes
 Motijhil, a lake in Murshidabad.
 Moti Jheel, a lake in Kanpur.
 Moti Jheel, Motihari, a lake in Motihari, Bihar.